Arya Samaj is a monotheistic Indian Hindu reform movement that promotes values and practices based on the belief in the infallible authority of the Vedas. The samaj was founded by the sannyasi (ascetic) Dayanand Saraswati in the 1870s.

Arya Samaj was the first Hindu organization to introduce proselytization in Hinduism. The organization has also worked towards the growth of civil rights movement in India since 1800s.

Dayananda Saraswati and Foundation
The formal foundation date of the Arya Samaj is 24 June 1877 because it was then, in Lahore when the Samaj became more than just a regional movement based in Punjab.

Vedic schools
Between 1869 and 1873, Dayanand began his efforts to reform orthodox Hinduism in India. He established Gurukul (Vedic schools) which emphasised Vedic values, culture, and Satya (Truth). The schools gave separate educations to boys and girls based on ancient Vedic principles. The Vedic school system was also to relieve Indians from the pattern of a British education.

At the schools, students received all meals, lodging, clothing and books free of charge. The discipline was strict. Students were not allowed to perform murti puja (worship of sculpted stone idols). Rather, they performed Sandhyavandanam (meditative prayer using Vedic mantras with divine sound) and Agnihotra (making heated milk offering twice daily).
 
The study of Sanskrit scriptural texts which accepted the authority of the Vedas were taught. They included the Vedas, Upanishads, Aranyaka, Kashika, Nirukta, Mahabhasya, Ashtadhyayi, Darshanas.

"The Light of Truth" lecture series

After visiting Calcutta, Dayanand's work changed. He began lecturing in Hindi rather than in Sanskrit. Although Sanskrit garnered respect, in Hindi, Dayanand reached a much larger audience. His ideas of reform began to reach the poorest people.

In Varanasi, after hearing Dayanand speak, a local government official called Jaikishen Das encouraged Dayanand to publish a book about his ideas. From June to September 1874, Dayanand dictated a series of lectures to his scribe, Bhimsen Sharma. The lectures recorded Dayanand's views on a wide range of subjects. They were published in 1875 in Varanasi with the title Satyarth Prakash ("The Light of Truth").

Discourse with Prarthana Samaj in Bombay
While his manuscript for Satyarth Prakash was being edited in Varanasi, Dayanand received an invitation to travel to Bombay. There, he was to debate representatives of the Vallabhacharya sect. On 20 October 1874, Dayanand arrived in Bombay. The debate, though well publicized, never took place. Nonetheless, two members of the Prarthana Samaj approached Dayanand and invited him to speak at one of their gatherings. He did so and was well received. They recognized Dayanand's desire to uplift the Hindu community and protect Hindus from the pressures to convert to Christianity or Islam.

Visit to Rajkot Prarthana Samaj
On 31 December 1874, Dayanand arrived in Rajkot, Gujarat, on the invitation of Hargovind Das Dvarkadas, the secretary of the local Prarthana Samaj. He invited topics of discourse from the audience and spoke on eight. Dayanand was well received here. After leaving Rajkot, Dayanand went to Ahmedabad.

Bombay Arya Samaj

On his return to Bombay, Dayanand began a membership drive for a local Arya Samaj and received one hundred enrollees. On 7 April 1875, Bombay Arya Samaj was established. Dayanand himself enrolled as a member rather than the leader of the Bombay group. However this Samaj only lasted for a few months after Swami left for the Punjab

Emergence of Arya Samaj in Punjab (1875) 
Due to Schisms in Adi Brahmo Samaj at Calcutta, a new variant of Adi Brahmoism called Arya Samaj began to take root in the Punjab. When he traveled to Calcutta Swami Dayanand had come into close and extended contact with Raj Narayan Bose, Debendranath Tagore etc. Swami Dayanand closely studied Tagore's book Brahmo Dharma, a comprehensive manual of religion and ethics for Adi Dharma, while in Calcutta. The bone of contention between these two Samaj's was over the authority of the Vedas - whose authority the Adi Dharma reject and hold to be inferior works, whereas Arya Samaj hold Vedas to be divine revelation. Despite this difference of opinion, however, it seems that the members of the Brahmo Samaj and Swami Dayanand parted on good terms, the former having publicly praised the latter’s visit to Calcutta in several journals and the latter having taken inspiration from the former’s activity in the social sphere.

Growth of Arya Samaj after Dayanand
Dayanand was assassinated in 1883. Despite this set back, the Arya Samaj continued to grow, especially in Punjab. The early leaders of the Samaj were Pandit Lekh Ram (1858  1897) and Swami Shraddhanand (Mahatma Munshi Ram Vij) (1856  1926). Some authors claim that the activities of the Samaj led to increased antagonism between Muslims and Hindus. Shraddhanand led the Shuddhi movement that aimed to bring Hindus who had converted to other religions back to Hinduism.

In 1893, the Arya Samaj members of Punjab were divided on the question of vegetarianism. The group that refrained from eating meat were called the "Mahatma" group and the other group, the "Cultured Party".

In the early 1900s, the Samaj (or organizations inspired by it such as Jat Pat Todak Mandal) campaigned against caste discrimination. They also campaigned for widow remarriage and women's education. The samaj also established chapters in British colonies having Indian population such as South Africa, Fiji, Mauritius, Suriname, Guyana and Trinidad and Tobago.

Prominent Indian Nationalists such as Lala Lajpat Rai belonged to Arya Samaj and were active in its campaigning. Bhagat Singh's grandfather followed Arya Samaj, which had a considerable influence on Bhagat Singh. The British colonial government in the early part of 20th century viewed the Samaj as a political body. Some Samajis in government service were dismissed for belonging to the Samaj.

In the 1930s, when the Hindu Nationalist group, the Rashtriya Swayamsevak Sangh grew in prominence in Northern India, they found support from the Arya Samaj of Punjab.

Arya Samaj in Punjab
In Punjab, the Arya Samaj was opposed by the Ahmadiyya movement which provided the Samaj one of its most aggressive opponents from among the various Muslim groups and whose founder Mirza Ghulam Ahmad was extensively involved in theological disputations with Samaj leaders, most notably with Pandit Lekh Ram. It was also opposed by the Sikh dominated Singh Sabha, the forerunner of the Akali Dal.

Arya Samaj in Sindh
The Samaj was active in Sindh at the end of the 19th and the beginning of the 20th century. The activities of the Samaj in the region included using shuddhi in integrating half-Muslim or low-caste communities into the organization. Narayan Dev, a Samaj member active in making many conversions is extolled as a Sindhi martyr. He is sometimes referred to as 'Dayanand ka vir sipahi' (Dayanand's 's heroic soldier). Dev was killed in a street fight in 1948. The history of Sindhi nationalism is also tied with the activities of the Arya Samaj. In the 19th century, the Hindu community of Sindh had been challenged by Christian missionaries and the Samaj served as a deterrent to the "conversion" done by Christian missionaries in the region. A Hindu Sindhi leader, K. R. Malkani, later on became prominent in the Rashtriya Swayamsevak Sangh (RSS), and the BJP. According to Malkani, the Arya Samaj created a "new pride" among the Hindu Sindhis by opening gymnasia and Sanskrit pathshalas in the 1930s.

Arya Samaj in Gujarat
The Arya Samaj of Gujarat members were missionaries from Punjab who had been encouraged to move to Gujarat to carry out educational work amongst the untouchable castes by the maharaja, Sayajirao Gaekwad III. The Gujarat Samaj opened orphanages. The samaj starting losing support when Mahatma Gandhi returned to India in 1915 because many activist joined his movement.

Reconversion in Malabar
In 1921, during a rebellion by the Muslim Moplah community of Malabar Indian newspapers reported that a number of Hindus were forcibly converted to Islam. The Arya Samaj extended its efforts to the region to reconvert these people back to Hinduism through Shuddhi ceremonies.

Views of Orthodox Hindu on the Samaj
The then Shankaracharya of Badrinath math in 1939 in a letter to the archbishop of Canterbury, called Arya Samajis Un-Hindu. He also criticized the Samaj efforts at converting Christians and Muslims.

Arya Samaj in Hyderabad state
A branch of Arya Samaj was established at Dharur in Beed district of Hyderabad state, the largest princely state during British colonial rule. Keshav Rao Koratkar was the president of the organization until 1932. During his tenure, the Samaj, established schools and libraries throughout the state. Although a social and religious organization, the Samaj activities assumed a great political role in resisting the government of the Nizam during 1930s. In 1938–1939, Arya Samaj teamed up with the Hindu Mahasabha to resist the Nizam government through Satyagraha. The Nizam government responded by raiding and desecrating Arya Samaj mandirs. The Samaj, in turn, criticized Islam and the Islamic rulers of the state. This widely increased the gulf between the Hindu and Muslim population of the state.

Language issue
Arya Samaj promoted the use of Hindi in Punjab and discouraged the use of Punjabi. This was a serious point of difference between the Sikhs, represented by the Shiromani Akali Dal group and the Arya Samaj. The difference was marked during the period immediately following the independence of India and the time of the Punjabi Suba movement (demand for a Punjabi speaking state).

Humanitarian efforts
Arya Samaj is a charitable organisation. For example, donations were made to victims of the 1905 Kangra earthquake. The samaj campaigned for women's right to vote, and for the protection of widows.

Contemporary Arya Samaj

Arya Samaj in India
Arya Samaj schools and temples are found in almost all major cities and as well as in rural areas (especially in the North region) of India. Some are authorised to conduct weddings. The Samaj is associated with the Dayanand Anglo Vedic (DAV) schools which number over eight hundred. There are eight million followers of the Samaj in India.

The former Indian prime minister Charan Singh, as a young man, was a member of Arya Samaj in Ghaziabad.

A branch of Arya Samaj was established in 2015 in Angul district in the state of Odisha.

Arya Samaj around the world
Arya Samaj is active in countries including Guyana, Suriname, Trinidad and Tobago, Fiji, Australia, South Africa, Kenya, Mauritius and other countries where a significant Hindu diaspora is present. The Arya Samaj in Kenya runs a number of schools in Nairobi and other cities of the country.

Immigrants to Canada and the United States from South Asia, Eastern Africa, South Africa, and the Caribbean countries have set up Arya Samaj temples for their respective communities. Most major metropolitan areas of the United States have chapters of Arya Samaj.

Core beliefs

Members of the Arya Samaj believe in one creator God referred to with the syllable 'Aum' as mentioned in the Yajur Veda (40:17). They believe the Vedas are an infallible authority, and they respect the Upanishads and Vedic philosophy. The Arya Samaj members reject other Hindu religious texts because they are not "pure" works, and because these texts promote things do not support their ideology and are therefore against the Vedas. For instance, they believe epics like the Ramayana and the Mahabharata are legends of historical figures, and reject them as reference to supreme beings and avatars. The members of Arya Samaj also reject other scriptural works such as the Puranas, the Bible, and the Quran. Worship of idols (murti puja) is strictly prohibited.

The core beliefs of Arya Samaj are postulated below:

 The primeval cause of all genuine knowledge and all that is known by means of knowledge is God.
 God is truth-consciousness: formless, omnipotent, unborn, infinite, unchangeable, incomparable, omnipresent, internal, undecaying, immortal, eternal, holy, and creator of the universe. God alone deserves worship.
 The Vedas are repositories of all of true knowledge. It is the paramount duty of all Aryas to study and teach and to propound the Veda.
 One should be ever ready to imbibe truth and forsake untruth.
 All acts should be done in accordance with Dharma, i.e. after deliberating upon what is truth and untruth.
 The prime object of Arya Samaj is to do good to the whole world, i.e. to achieve physical, spiritual and social prosperity for all.
 Our conduct towards all should be guided by love, by injunctions of Dharma and according to their respective positions.
 One should dispel ignorance and promote knowledge.
 One should not be content with one's own prosperity only, but should consider the prosperity of all as his own prosperity.
 All human beings should abide by the rules concerning social or everyone's benefit, while everyone should be free to follow any rule beneficial for him/her.

Practices

The Arya Samaj members consider the Gayatri Mantra, as the most holy mantra and chant it periodically, do the meditation known as "Sandhya" and make offering to the holy fire (havan). The havan can be performed with a priest for special occasions or without a priest for personal worship. The priest is generally a Vedic scholar from the local Arya Samaj Mandir or Gurukul. Sometimes elder members of family or neighbours can also perform the havan acting as a purohit. The host is known as the "Yajmana". The priest can be called an "Acharya", "Swami Ji" or "Pandit Ji" depending upon his scholarly status and local reputation. It is customary to give a nominal "dakshina" to the priest after havan, although in Arya Samaj it is more symbolic and the priest does not state any sum. The sum is decided by the host's capability and status but is still a small amount.

Members celebrate Holi (the start of spring) and Diwali (a harvest festival and the victory of good over evil).

Arya Samaj advocates a lacto-vegetarian diet and in particular, the eating of beef is prohibited.

After a death, Arya Samajis will often conduct a havan and collect the ashes on the fourth day.

Diwali
Diwali is a very important day in Arya Samaj as Swami Dayanand died this day. A special havan is done for the same.

The Arya Samaj version of the Hindu festival Diwali is typified by the celebration in Suriname. The festival celebrates the victory of good over evil. A vegetarian fast is kept. The Gayatri Mantra is recited while oil lamps are lit, in front of a fire altar lit with sandalwood. One Diya lamp, which is of larger size has two wicks crossed to produce four lights, one in each direction and is lit first. The smaller lamp has one wick. A lamp is kept in every room except the bathroom and restroom. More lamps can be lit, which can be placed arbitrarily in the yard, living room and so on.

Holi
Holi is celebrated as the conclusion of winter and the start of spring to sow the land and hope for a good harvest. This day is marked by colors and songs (Chautal). It does not require specific prayer or fasting, however, some people keep a vegetarian fast on this day. The festivities do not associate Holi with a particular deity such as Vishnu or Shiva. The early Arya Samajist in 19th century Lahore adapted the festival to include prayers and havan but avoid the intoxication, and obscenities associated with traditional celebrations.

Arya Samaj across the world

Arya Samaj in Burma
Arya Samaj in Fiji
Arya Samaj in Ghana
Arya Samaj in Guyana
Arya Samaj in Kenya
Arya Samaj in Mauritius
Arya Samaj in Mozambique
Arya Samaj in Singapore
Arya Samaj in South Africa
Arya Samaj in Suriname
Arya Samaj in Tanzania
Arya Samaj in Trinidad and Tobago
Arya Samaj in Thailand
Arya Samaj in Uganda

See also

 Guru–shishya tradition
 Hindu reform movements
 Sampradaya

References

Further reading

 Chamupati M. A. (2001) Ten Commandments of Arya Samaj New Delhi: D.A.V. Publications.
 Jordens J. T. F. (1978) Dayanada Saraswati Oxford University Press, Delhi
Madhu Kishwar, "The Daughters of Aryavarta: Women in the Arya Samaj movement, Punjab." Chapter in Women in Colonial India; Essays on Survival, Work and the State, edited by J. Krishnamurthy, Oxford University Press, 1989.
 Rai L. (1915) The Arya Samaj: an Account of its Aims, Doctrine and Activities, with a Biographical Sketch of the Founder D.A.V. College Managing Committee, New Delhi .
 Rai L. (1993) A History of the Arya Samaj New Delhi .
 Ruthven M. (2007) Fundamentalism: a Very Short Introduction Oxford University Press .
 Sharma J. M. (1998) Swami Dayanand: a Biography USB, India .
 Sethi R. "Rashtra Pitamah Swami Dayanand Saraswati" M R Sethi Educational Trust, Chandigarh.
 Upadhyaya G. P. (1954) The Origin, Scope and Mission of the Arya Samaj Arya Samaj.
 Shastri V. (1967) The Arya Samaj Sarvadeshik Arya Pratinidhi Sabha.
 Pandey D. (1972) The Arya Samaj and Indian Nationalism, 1875–1920 S. Chand.
 Pandit S. (1975) A Critical Study of the Contribution of the Arya Samaj to Indian Education Sarvadeshik Arya, Pratinidhi Sabha.
 Vedalanker N. and Somera M. (1975) Arya Samaj and Indians Abroad Sarvadeshik Arya Pratinidhi Sabha.
 Vable D. (1983) The Arya Samaj: Hindu Without Hinduism Vikas.
 Sharma S. K. (1985) Social Movements and Social Change: a Study of Arya Samaj and Untouchables in Punjab B.R. Publishing.
 Yadav K. C. and Arya K. S. (1988) Arya Samaj and the Freedom Movement: 1875–1918 Manohar Publications. .
 Saxena G. S. (1990) Arya Samaj Movement in India, 1875–1947 Commonwealth Publishers. .
 Sethi R. (2009) Rashtra Pitamah, Swami Dayanand Saraswati M R Sethi Educational Trust, Chandigarh
 Chopra R. M. (2009) Hinduism Today 
 Jamnager A. S. and Pandya D. Aryasamaj Ke Stambh A. S. Jamnager's website.
 Jones K. Arya Dharm: Hindu Consciousness in 19th-Century Punjab 
 Dayananda, S., & Bharadwaja, C. (1932). Light of truth, or, An English translation of the Satyartha prakasha: The well-known work of Swami Dayananda Saraswati. Madras: Arya Samaj.
Swami Shraddhananda, . (1926). Hindu sangathan: Saviour of the dying race. Delhi: Shraddhananda.
 Swami Śraddhānanda, . (1984). Inside the Congress: A collection of 26 articles. New Delhi: Dayanand Sansthan.

External links

 
Nirguna worship traditions
Hindu organizations
Hindu new religious movements
Monotheistic religions
Religious organisations based in India
Religious organizations established in 1875
1875 establishments in British India